The 1994 World Fencing Championships were held from 3 July to 8 July 1994 in Athens, Greece.

Medal summary

Men's events

Women's events

Medal table

References
FIE Results

World Fencing Championships
F
1994 in Greek sport
1990s in Athens
Sports competitions in Athens
1994 in fencing
July 1994 sports events in Europe